Flavivirga rizhaonensis is a Gram-negative and aerobic bacterium from the genus of Flavivirga which has been isolated from sand from the Yellow Sea.

References 

Flavobacteria
Bacteria described in 2020